Christolea is a genus of flowering plants belonging to the family Brassicaceae.

Its native range is Afghanistan to Central Asia and Western China.

Species:

Christolea crassifolia 
Christolea niyaensis

References

Brassicaceae
Brassicaceae genera